Soul Shine Magazine is a Canadian online music magazine covering independent and mainstream artists from a variety of genres and backgrounds.

History and profile
Soul Shine Magazine was founded in 2002. The magazine is based in Toronto, Ontario.
 
Lindsay and Paul Whitfield are the magazine's creative team, providing coverage of independent and mainstream artists, daily music news, interviews, gig and album reviews, gig listings, games, contests, and Soul Shines indie radio.

References

External links
 Soul Shine Magazine website

2002 establishments in Ontario
Magazines established in 2002
Magazines published in Toronto
Online music magazines published in Canada